LÉ George Bernard Shaw (P64) is a  (OPV) of the Irish Naval Service. It is the fourth ship in a series of vessels designed by Vard Marine and built by Babcock Marine Appledore, and is named for the writer George Bernard Shaw.

Constructed in Devon, England, the vessel underwent keel laying in February 2017. The vessel was first floated-out of the dry dock during March 2018, and was delivered to Haulbowline Naval Base on 11 October 2018, pending final fitting out, including installation of the main 76 mm cannon.

In December 2018, the vessel was made available for tours by the public in Galway, and it was formally commissioned in April 2019.

Operational Service
At around 1.10 am on 25 March 2020 a burglary occurred while the vessel was docked at Sir John Rogerson's Quay. A man in his 30s was arrested and charged in relation to the incident, appearing before the courts the afternoon of 25 March.

Gallery

References

Samuel Beckett-class offshore patrol vessels
2018 ships
Ships built in Devon